Bruce R. Van Ness (March 9, 1946 – November 5, 2007) was a Canadian football player who played for the Montreal Alouettes. He won the Grey Cup with them in 1970. He previously played football at Rutgers University. In 2007, he died at a nursing home in South Carolina.

References

1946 births
2007 deaths
Montreal Alouettes players
Rutgers Scarlet Knights football players
American football running backs
Canadian football running backs
American players of Canadian football
People from Teaneck, New Jersey
Players of American football from New Jersey